The 1943 Memphis Naval Air Station Blues football team represented the Memphis Naval Air Station during the 1943 college football season. After starting with a 3–0 record, the rest of the Memphis Naval Station's football games were abruptly cancelled on October 10, when the Navy ruled that the NAS could not play at Crump Stadium in Memphis, and so no longer had an adequate playing field to conduct the remainder of their contests. Memphis Naval held out for three weeks in the first three AP polling's of the 1943 season, but were eventually dropped from the rankings on October 25.

Schedule

References

Memphis Memphis Naval Air Station
College football undefeated seasons
Memphis Memphis Naval Air Station Blues football